The banded cusk-eel (Raneya brasiliensis) is a species of cusk-eel found along the southeast coast of South America from southern Brazil to northern Argentina. This species grows to a length of  TL. It is the only known member of its genus. The generic name honours the American ichthyologist Edward C. Raney (1909–1984) of Cornell University who introduced the describer Charles R. Robins to ichthyology.

References

Ophidiidae
Monotypic fish genera
Taxa named by Johann Jakob Kaup
Fish described in 1856